The Sanjak of Serfiğe was a second-level Ottoman province (sanjak or liva) centred on the town of Serfiğe (Servia) in western Macedonia, now part of Greece.

The sanjak was founded in 1881, after the Greek annexation of Thessaly (the sanjak of Tirhala), initially as an independent province, and after 1889 as part of Manastir Vilayet. In 1912, the province encompassed six kazas (districts): Nasliç (Voio), Serfiğe itself, Kozana (Kozani), Kayalar (Ptolemaida), Nasliğ (Neapoli, Kozani), Grebene (Grevena) and Alasonya (Elassona).

The sanjak was conquered by the Greek Army in October 1912, during the First Balkan War.

References 

Macedonia under the Ottoman Empire
Sanjaks of the Ottoman Empire in Europe
States and territories established in 1881
States and territories disestablished in 1912
1881 establishments in the Ottoman Empire
1912 disestablishments in the Ottoman Empire